Bakalowits is a producer of crystal chandeliers based in Vienna.

History
It was founded in 1845 by Elias Bakalowits. The company became very successful in providing crystal as well as lighting for palaces ad other notable buildings. The original store was located on the Hoher Markt. His grandson Ludwig Bakalowits received an imperial warrant and became a purveyor to the imperial court in Vienna. Bakalowits has been in business for over 165 years.

Products
Bakalowits is known for producing over 8,000 different styles of lighting fixtures that include contemporary and historical designs for commercial and residential locations. The settings that the lighting fixtures have been placed include:
hotels
palaces
conference centers
opera houses
cruise ships
private homes

Business information
Bakalowits has been able to be featured in various countries such as Europe, Asia, and the Middle East. This business has also been able to take older chandeliers and restore them. Bakalowits now has the ability to export its products worldwide.

References

External links 

Homepage of Bakalowits

Manufacturing companies based in Vienna
Purveyors to the Imperial and Royal Court